Hut 33 is a BBC Radio 4 sitcom set at Bletchley Park in 1941.  It includes both the writer (James Cary) and producer (Adam Bromley) from Think the Unthinkable and Concrete Cow.

Production
The first six-part series  was recorded at the BBC Radio Theatre in Broadcasting House on 24 June, 1 July and 8 July 2007. It was broadcast at 11.30am on Mondays from 25 June to 30 July 2007. The second series ran from 21 May to 25 June 2008. James Cary began writing Series 3 in February 2009. The third series was recorded on 25 May, 25 September and 27 September 2009. Series three broadcasts began 14 October 2009.

Cast
Tom Goodman-Hill as Archie, a Geordie Marxist. Spends a great deal of his time antagonising Charles.
Robert Bathurst as Professor Charles Gardner, the ultra-conservative snob and don who rejected Archie from Oxford University for not knowing how to use a fish knife at the dinner table. He works as a translator.
Fergus Craig as Gordon, 17-year-old child mathematics prodigy, still in short trousers, in love with Minka.
Alex MacQueen as 3rd Lt. Joshua Featherstonhaugh-Marshall ("Josh"), theoretically in charge of the hut, made 3rd Lt when he could not be demoted any further from 2nd Lt after losing a tank regiment in the Battle of France by driving them into the sea.  Josh did attend Oxford, which angers Archie, especially once he discovers that Charles let Josh in as a quid pro quo for admission to the Garrick Club.
Olivia Colman as Minka, the Hut's Polish secretary, worryingly keen on extreme violence as the solution to all problems.  Minka also takes jobs such as watchperson, interrogator, camp guard, detective and burglar.  A running joke involves Minka startling the other characters by sneaking up silently and suddenly announcing her presence.
Lill Roughley as Mrs Best, their sex-obsessed landlady who claims to have bedded both Bomber Harris and Hermann Göring.  Not to mention Donald Bradman, Albert Einstein, the Pope and just about any other notable person of her time.
Winstanley, the silent occupant of Hut 33 always working at his desk.  At any given time he may be naked, or wearing pyjamas, or otherwise eccentrically dressed.  In series 1 episode 3 he decides to wear a suit of armour, so his responses are assorted clanks and creaks – or is he just an empty suit?

Episodes

Series 1

Series 2

Series 3

References

External links

Hut 33 blog by the writer

2007 radio programme debuts
BBC Radio comedy programmes
BBC Radio 4 programmes
Bletchley Park